is a single by Japanese boy band Kis-My-Ft2. It was released on March 27, 2013. It debuted in number one on the weekly Oricon Singles Chart and reached number one on the Billboard Japan Hot 100. It was the 27th best-selling single in Japan in 2013, with 262,737 copies.

References 

2013 singles
2013 songs
Kis-My-Ft2 songs
Oricon Weekly number-one singles
Billboard Japan Hot 100 number-one singles
Japanese-language songs